The Ohio State Limited was a named passenger train operated by the New York Central Railroad (NYC) between New York City and Cincinnati, Ohio, via Buffalo and Cleveland, Ohio. Service began in 1924 and continued until 1967, with some vestiges remaining until 1971.

History

NYC began the Ohio State Limited on April 27, 1924. The new service departed Grand Central Terminal at 3 PM, just after the 20th Century Limited, with a scheduled arrival in Cincinnati of 9:30 AM the following morning. A section of the train split at Cleveland, Ohio to serve Toledo, Ohio, while the Boston & Albany Railroad exchanged through cars for Boston, Massachusetts at Albany, New York. The train used the Big Four route between Toledo and Cincinnati. In 1941 the Ohio State Limited began receiving lightweight streamlined equipment, becoming part of the NYC's famed "Great Steel Fleet." The train was fully re-equipped with lightweight equipment by 1949. Its chief postwar rival was the Pennsylvania Railroad's Cincinnati Limited.

By 1960 the eastbound trip of train at Buffalo picked up coaches and sleeping cars from the NYC's #376, from Toronto, Ontario for continuous service to New York City. The NYC's Cleveland Limited from New York City to Buffalo likewise carried coaches and sleepers for a counterpart northwest-bound train (NYC #371) to Toronto. In 1962 the Ohio State Limited was one of several NYC trains to receive the new slumbercoach economy sleeping cars in a failed attempt to revive flagging business.  In the early 1960s the Ohio State Limited ran combined with the New York-St. Louis Southwestern Limited between New York-Cleveland as a cost-saving measure.

The end came on December 2, 1967, when NYC eliminated all named trains in anticipation of a transition toward short-haul corridor services. The last remnant of the Ohio State Limited was a rump coach trip between Cleveland-Cincinnati, often running with a single car. This remained the case after the Penn Central merger and survived until Amtrak took over most passenger services on May 1, 1971, when it was discontinued. The alternate Toronto-New York City itinerary would be restored in 1981 when Amtrak initiated the Maple Leaf.

Major stops prior to 1967
These were stops at sizable locales on the route west:
New York City
Yonkers
Poughkeepsie
Albany
Utica
Syracuse
Rochester
Buffalo
Erie
Cleveland
Columbus
Springfield
Dayton
Cincinnati

References

External links 
 Ohio State Limited at American Rails, including 1944 timetable

Named passenger trains of the United States
Passenger trains of the New York Central Railroad
Railway services introduced in 1924
Night trains of the United States
Railway services discontinued in 1967
Rail transportation in New York (state)
Passenger rail transportation in Pennsylvania
Passenger rail transportation in Ohio